Sanlıca is a small village in Tarsus district of Mersin Province, Turkey. It is situated in Toros Mountains and extreme east of the province. The population of village was 105  as of 2012.

References

Villages in Tarsus District